In computing, del (or erase) is a command in command-line interpreters (shells) such as COMMAND.COM, cmd.exe, 4DOS, NDOS, 4OS2, 4NT and Windows PowerShell. It is used to delete one or more files or directories from a file system.

Implementations
The command is available for various operating systems including DOS, Microware OS-9, IBM OS/2, Microsoft Windows and ReactOS. It is analogous to the Unix rm command and to the Stratus OpenVOS delete_file and delete_dircommands.

DEC RT-11, OS/8, RSX-11, and OpenVMS also provide the delete command which can be contracted to del. AmigaDOS and TSC FLEX provide a delete command as well.

The erase command is supported by Tim Paterson's SCP 86-DOS. On MS-DOS, the command is available in versions 1 and later. It is also available in the open-source MS-DOS emulator DOSBox.

While Digital Research DR-DOS supports del and erase as well, it also supports the shorthand form era, which derived from CP/M. In addition to this, the DR-DOS command processor also supports delq/eraq. These are shorthand forms for the del/era/erase command with an assumed /Q parameter (for 'Query') given as well.

THEOS/OASIS and FlexOS provide only the erase command.

In PowerShell, del and erase are predefined command aliases for the Remove-Item cmdlet which basically serves the same purpose.

Syntax
del filename
erase filename

See also
deltree
rmdir
List of DOS commands
List of Unix commands

References

Further reading

External links

del | Microsoft Docs

Internal DOS commands
MSX-DOS commands
OS/2 commands
ReactOS commands
Windows commands
Microcomputer software
Windows administration
File deletion